Leandro Paulino Da Silva (born 7 April 1986 in Iretama), known as Leandro Silva, is a Brazilian footballer who plays for Linense as a central defender.

Career
Played in the Atlético Paranaense and Corinthians Paranaense.

References

External links
Leandro Silva at Footballzz

1986 births
Living people
Brazilian footballers
Campeonato Brasileiro Série A players
Campeonato Brasileiro Série B players
Paraná Clube players
Club Athletico Paranaense players
Associação Portuguesa de Desportos players
Boa Esporte Clube players
Coritiba Foot Ball Club players
Association football defenders